Kabah may refer to:

 Kabah (Maya site), a Maya civilization city in Yucatán, Mexico
 Kaaba, the holy building in Mecca, Saudi Arabia
 Kabah (band), a Mexican pop music group

See also
 Kaba (disambiguation)